Lacrosse or Onyx is a series of terrestrial radar imaging reconnaissance satellites operated by the United States National Reconnaissance Office (NRO). While not officially confirmed by the NRO or the Government of the United States prior to 2008, there was widespread evidence pointing to its existence, including one NASA website. In July 2008, the NRO itself declassified the existence of its synthetic aperture radar (SAR) satellite constellation.

According to former Director of Central Intelligence Admiral Stansfield Turner, Lacrosse had its origins in 1950 (1980?)  when a dispute between the Central Intelligence Agency and the U.S. Air Force as to whether a combined optical/radar reconnaissance satellite (the CIA proposal) or a radar-only one (the USAF proposal) should be developed was resolved in favor of the USAF.

Lacrosse uses synthetic aperture radar as its prime imaging instrument.  It is able to see through cloud cover and also has some ability to penetrate soil, though there have been more powerful instruments deployed in space for this specific purpose.  Early versions are believed to have used the Tracking and Data Relay Satellite System (TDRSS) to relay imagery to a ground station at White Sands, New Mexico. There are some indications that other relay satellites may now be available for use with Lacrosse. The name Lacrosse is used to refer to all variants, while Onyx is sometimes used to refer to the three newer units.

Unit costs (including launch) in 1990 dollars are estimated to be in the range of US$0.5 to 1.0 billion.

Future 
It had been anticipated that the Lacrosse satellites would be replaced by the radar component of the Future Imagery Architecture (FIA). The severe program problems encountered by FIA in the early 2000s (decade)  led to a plan to off-load radar reconnaissance to the Space Based Radar, later simplified to Space Radar, with initial launch anticipated around 2015. This program itself was axed by Congress late 2008. The launch of NROL-41 (USA 215) in September 2010 has all orbital characteristics of a radar remote sensing platform (see FIA) and could be the first of a Lacrosse follow-up program. Its orbit is a retrograde version of the "frozen" Lacrosse orbit, the choice for a retrograde orbit itself indicating a SAR role.

Launches

Five Lacrosse spacecraft have been launched, with three currently in orbit. The Lacrosse move in orbital planes either 68° or 57° inclined. These orbital inclinations of 68° and 57°, combined with their altitude give the satellites a complete view of the Earth's surface, including the north and south poles. Lacrosse 5 appears to differ somewhat from the previous four satellites. As determined by amateur observers, there are subtle differences in its orbit, and its color is somewhat whiter than the distinct red-orange tint of the earlier ones. Most strikingly, it sometimes fades from brightness to invisibility within the space of a few seconds while still in full sunlight. (Amateur observers call this rapid fade its "disappearing trick", although it appears to be an accidental phenomenon due to the design of the craft and not a reconnaissance feature.)

In pop culture
The story of the 1994 Andy Sidaris film The Dallas Connection involves a series of codes necessary to control a Lacrosse reconnaissance satellite.

The plot of the 2018 Hindi movie Parmanu: The Story of Pokhran involves a Lacrosse satellite as the US intelligence eye in the sky.

See also 
 Quill (satellite)
 SAR-Lupe, a German radar imaging reconnaissance satellite

References 

 Jeffrey T. Richelson, America's Secret Eyes in Space, New York, Harper & Row, 1990
 Stansfield Turner, Burn Before Reading, New York, Hyperion, 2005
 "Spy Satellites: Entering a New Era", Science, 24 March 1989

External links 

 Lacrosse at Encyclopedia Astronautica
 Globalsecurity.org page on Lacrosse
 Globalsecurity.org page on TDRSS
 Lacrosse 2 orbit at Heavens Above
 Lacrosse 3 orbit at Heavens Above
 Lacrosse 4 orbit at Heavens Above
 Lacrosse 5 orbit at Heavens Above
 Lacrosse at satobs.org
 Imagery by amateur astronomer using 10'' reflector
 Photometric curves showing Lacrosse 5 disappearing trick

Lockheed Martin satellites and probes
Military space program of the United States
National Reconnaissance Office satellites
Synthetic aperture radar satellites
Satellite series
Military equipment introduced in the 1980s